The Democratic Way Party, also known as the People's Way party, is a political party in Armenia. It is led by Manuel Gasparyan.

History
The Democratic Way Party was founded in 2006 and is led by Manuel Gasparyan, a former member of parliament and son of Manuk Gasparyan, the founder of the party. The party was a former member of the Armenian National Congress. The party currently has no representation in the National Assembly and acts as an extra-parliamentary force. 

Prior to the 2018 Armenian parliamentary election, the party announced its support and endorsement of the Sasna Tsrer Pan-Armenian Party.

The party boycotted the 2021 Armenian parliamentary elections, claiming the election would be rigged. In December 2021, the party signed a declaration with over a dozen other political parties calling on the government to respect democracy and human rights in the country.

Electoral record

National elections
The party participated in the 2007 Armenian parliamentary election, winning 1.05% of the vote.

The party participated in the 2012 Armenian parliamentary election, winning 0.36% of the vote.

Local elections
Several party members participated in the 2013 Yerevan City Council election, under the Heritage party's Hello Yerevan alliance. The alliance came in third place, winning 8.48% of the vote.

The party participated in the 2018 Yerevan City Council election and nominated Manuel Gasparyan to run for mayor of Yerevan. Following the election, the party won just 0.22% of the popular vote, failing to win any seats in the Yerevan City Council. The party released a statement after the election congratulating Prime Minister Nikol Pashinyan's My Step Alliance.

See also

Programs of political parties in Armenia

References

Political parties established in 2006
2006 establishments in Armenia
Political parties in Armenia